The women's 10 metre running target competition at the 2014 Asian Games in Incheon, South Korea was held on 26 September at the Ongnyeon International Shooting Range.

Schedule
All times are Korea Standard Time (UTC+09:00)

Records

Results

Qualification

Knockout round

Semifinals

Bronze medal match

Gold medal match

References

ISSF Results Overview

External links
Official website

Women RT